The Battle of Kilrush was a fought during the Irish Confederate Wars. It was fought on 15 April 1642 between an Irish Royalist army under the Earl of Ormonde and Irish Confederate troops commanded by Lord Mountgarret.

Background
On 2 April 1642, the Earl of Ormonde, serving as the commander of the Royalist army in Ireland, led his second expedition into the counties of Kildare and Laois, reinforcing Royalist garrisons and wreaking havoc upon the landowners who had joined the Irish Rebellion of 1641. After a ten day period in which his forces traveled from Dublin to Maryborough (now Portlaoise), Ormonde returned part way back to Athy and became aware of the nearby presence of a large rebel militia attempting to intercept his force as they returned to Dublin.

Before the battle
Although Ormonde had left Dublin with 3,000 foot and 500 horse, his reinforcement activities had significantly reduced the size of his detachment and he desired to avoid a direct confrontation with the rebels if possible. The rebel militia, estimated to be as large as 8,000 foot with several hundred horse, was reported to have crossed the River Barrow at Mageny-ford 10 kilometers to the south. The rebel militia was commanded by Lord Mountgarret and attended by other rebel leaders including Rory O'Moore and Hugh O'Byrne. As it happened, Ormonde and Mountgarret were cousins within the Butler dynasty.

Given his predicament, Ormonde moved out of Athy early on the morning of 15 April traveling northeast along the high ground through the towns of Ardscull and Funtstown. The rebel militia moved concurrently in the same direction along the high ground southeast of Ormonde's army through the towns of Ballyndrum and Narraghmore. The rebels were attempting to reach the Ballyshannon pass before the Royalists. Slowed by his wagons and baggage, Ormonde decided to send his cavalry on ahead. The rebels arrived first and took positions in Kilrush and Bullhill intercepting Ormonde's force.

The Battle
Although he was outnumbered, Ormonde managed to defeat the rebels. Mountgarret's militia was poorly organized and the Royalist cavalry led the way breaking the left wing of the rebel militia with their first charge. The right wing of the rebel militia held for some time but later retreated and broke. Many of the fleeing rebels were overtaken and killed. Other rebels sought the safety of a nearby bog, where the Royalist horse could not follow. 

Rebel sources claimed their casualties were very light while Ormonde claimed that over 500 rebels had been killed. The actual number of rebel casualties is unknown although a number of ranked individuals were reported to be lost and the rebel militia participating in this battle ceased to exist. Royalist losses were reported to be 20 killed and 40 wounded.

Aftermath
The Royalists considered the battle such a great victory that the Irish government presented Ormonde with a jewel valued at £500. The rebel leaders including Mountgarret, O'Moore, and O'Byrne all survived the battle and continued to play prominent roles in the Irish Confederate Wars. 

At the time the Royalist forces had many garrisons around Ireland, but only one field army, which, if it had been surrounded and destroyed at Kilrush, would have had enormous strategic effect across the whole island. This was the longer-term outcome of the battle.

References

Sources

Further reading

1642 in Ireland
Kilrush 1642
Kilrush 1642
Kilrush
Conflicts in 1642
Kilrush